North Coast Football is an association football competition on the north coast of New South Wales extending from Iluka in the north to Macksville in the south. The association was established in its current form in 2005, having previously been known as the separate entities of Holiday Coast Soccer and Clarence Soccer.

History
North Coast Football was originally formed in 1980 under the name of the North Coast Premier League, and later Holiday Coast Soccer, but the name was changed in 2005, a period which also marked the evolution of a number of clubs into their current forms (for example, Korora became Northern Storm in 2003). The league currently contains over 5000 players, and is also home to the two largest clubs in Northern New South Wales, Coffs City United FC and Northern Storm FC.

Clubs
There are 24 clubs in the region:

Honours

References

External links
North Coast Football
 

Soccer leagues in New South Wales